The O‘ahu ‘ō‘ō (Moho apicalis) was a member of the extinct genus of the ‘ō‘ōs (Moho) within the extinct family Mohoidae. It was previously regarded as member of the Australo-Pacific honeyeaters (Meliphagidae).

Description

 
The males reached a length of 30.5 centimeters. The wing length was 10.5 to 11.4 centimeters, the culmen was between 3.5 and 3.8 centimetres and the tarsus was between 3.4 and 3.8 centimeters. The females were smaller. The plumage was predominantly sooty black. The tail feathers were brown and had, with the exception of the two central tail feathers, white tips. Further characteristics were the white feather tufts under the axillaries and the two narrow central tail feathers which changed into fine hair-like or fibrous tips. The flanks and the undertail coverts were colored deeply yellow. The bill and the tarsus were black. Its biology was not well-studied.

Distribution and habitat
Its habitat was the mountain forests on O‘ahu.

Extinction
The O‘ahu ‘ō‘ō was first mentioned by Andrew Bloxam. While in the Hawaiian Islands in 1825 (as the naturalist on board HMS Blonde), he saw live specimens of the bird which were brought to him by locals. He preserved one specimen. He wrote in his diary (not published until much later): "They are now very scarce in all the islands. I did not see even one in the different excursions I made, & the natives asked a high price for the very few they brought to me." Bloxam misidentified the birds as the related species Moho nobilis.

John Gould scientifically named and described the O‘ahu ‘ō‘ō in 1860, when it was already regarded as extinct for 23 years. The last reliable evidence was a collection of about three birds by German naturalist Ferdinand Deppe in 1837, finding those specimens in the hills behind the capital, Honolulu.

After surveys led by ornithologist Robert C. L. Perkins and others failed to find the bird between 1880 and 1890, it was described as extinct. Today, there are seven specimens in museum collections in Berlin, London, New York City and Cambridge, Massachusetts.

The reasons for its extinction were (as typical for members of the Mohoidae) probably avian diseases caused by introduced mosquitos, habitat destruction by overgrazing from livestock and deforestation.

References

Bibliography
Munro, George C. (1944 and its revised 2nd. edition from 1960): Birds of Hawaii
Flannery, Tim & Schouten, Peter (2001): A Gap in Nature
Fuller, Errol (2000): Extinct Birds
Day, David (1981): The Doomsday Book of Animals
Greenway, James C. (1967): Extinct and Vanishing Birds of the World
Luther, Dieter (2005): Die ausgestorbenen Vögel der Welt

External links 
Species factsheet - BirdLife International

Endemic birds of Hawaii
Extinct birds of Hawaii
Moho (genus)
Bird extinctions since 1500
Birds described in 1860
Species made extinct by human activities